Bosworth is an English surname. Notable people with the surname include:

Adam Bosworth, known as one of the pioneers of XML
Alan Bosworth (born 1967), professional boxer
Allan R. Bosworth (1901–1986), author, journalist who served in the US Navy 
Anne Bosworth (1868–1907), American mathematician
Brian Bosworth, NFL linebacker
Brian Bosworth (born 1976), known as one of the internet streaming pioneers
Clifford Edmund Bosworth, British historian and orientalist
David Bosworth, American writer
David M. Bosworth (1897–1979), American orthopedic surgeon
F. F. Bosworth (1877–1958), Pentecostal revivalist preacher, advocate of divine healing, author of Christ the Healer
Hobart Bosworth (1867–1943), Californian movie actor, director, writer and producer
Joseph Bosworth, scholar of the Anglo-Saxon language
Kate Bosworth, American actress
Kyle Bosworth (born 1986), American football outside linebacker
Libbi Bosworth, Americana and alt-country singer-songwriter and recording artist from Texas
Lo Bosworth (born 1986), American television personality and author
Louise Marion Bosworth, pioneering American social researcher
Mary Francesca Bosworth, criminologist who is interested in imprisonment, race, and gender
Midge Bosworth, (born 1941), former Australian racing driver
Patricia Bosworth (1933-2020), American journalist and biographer
R. J. B. Bosworth, Australian historian and author
Rhondda Bosworth (born 1944), New Zealand photographer and artist
Roger Bosworth also Robert (1607–1660), English physician and politician
Stanley Bosworth (1927–2011), founder of Saint Ann's School in New York City
Stephen W. Bosworth, Dean of the Fletcher School of Law and Diplomacy
Thomas Bosworth (born 1930), American architect and architectural educator
Tom Bosworth (born 1990), British race walker who holds two British Records
William W. Bosworth, Early 20th-century American architect, MIT campus